Stricken is a 2009 Dutch drama film directed and produced by Reinout Oerlemans and based on the book by the same name by writer Ray Kluun. The film was the highest-grossing Dutch film of the year with a gross of €9.3 million and is one of the 20 most popular Dutch films of all time.

Plot

Stijn (Barry Atsma) is a rich, handsome and self-centered advertising executive who lives in a hedonistic world. Everything revolves around him. He has a successful career and a loving marriage with Carmen (Carice van Houten). Occasionally he cheats, but it is tolerated due to his enthusiastic and impetuous character. Fate strikes as it turns out that Carmen is suffering from breast cancer. He supports her, but as it can sometimes be difficult, he will often go between meeting with Roos (Anna Drijver), with whom he has a tempestuous affair, and lying to Carmen. 
After Carmen is declared cured, Stijn comes clean with his cheating, and breaks up with Roos. Afterwards Carmen becomes ill again, this time terminally. Stijn breaks his promise to Carmen and resumes his relationship with Roos, although Carmen forgives him. She commits physician-assisted suicide by drinking a poison provided by a physician (Sacha Bulthuis). This does not work, so she then gets an injection from the doctor, and finally dies. After the death of Carmen, Stijn goes even further in his relationship with Roos.

Cast
 Barry Atsma - Stijn
 Carice van Houten - Carmen
 Anna Drijver - Roos
 Pierre Bokma - Huisarts
 Sacha Bulthuis - Oncoloog

References

External links 
 

2009 romantic drama films
2009 films
Dutch romantic drama films
2000s Dutch-language films